The 2015–16 Mississippi State Bulldogs women's basketball team represented Mississippi State University during the 2015–16 NCAA Division I women's basketball season. The Bulldogs were led by fourth year head coach Vic Schaefer. They played their home games at Humphrey Coliseum and were members of the Southeastern Conference. They finished the season 28–8, 11–5 in SEC play to finish in a tie for second place. They advanced to the championship game of the SEC women's tournament where they lost to South Carolina. They received an at-large bid to the NCAA women's tournament where defeated Chattanooga and Michigan State in the first and second rounds before getting dismantled by Connecticut by 60 points in the sweet sixteen, the largest defeat in Bulldogs women's basketball history.

Roster

Schedule

|-
!colspan=9 style="background:#660000; color:#FFFFFF;"| Exhibition

|-
!colspan=9 style="background:#660000; color:#FFFFFF;"| Non-conference regular season

|-
!colspan=9 style="background:#660000; color:#FFFFFF;"| SEC regular season

|-
!colspan=9 style="background:#660000; color:#FFFFFF;"| SEC Women's Tournament

|-
!colspan=9 style="background:#660000; color:#FFFFFF;"| NCAA Women's Tournament

Source:

Rankings

See also
 2015–16 Mississippi State Bulldogs men's basketball team

References

Mississippi State Bulldogs women's basketball seasons
Mississippi State
Mississippi State
2015 in sports in Mississippi
2016 in sports in Mississippi